LCO may refer to:
Lac Courte Oreilles Band of Lake Superior Chippewa Indians
Lague Airport's IATA airport code, Republic of the Congo
Las Cachorras Orientales, a Japanese professional wrestling tag team
Las Campanas Observatory, an astronomical observatory in Chile
Launch Control Operator/Officer
Lawn Care Operator
League of Legends Circuit Oceania
Legislative Competence Order
Libraries Connect Ohio
lipochitin oligosaccharide / lipo-chitin oligosaccharide
Lithium cobalt oxide, a cathode material for lithium-ion batteries
Lithuanian Chamber Orchestra
Local Cable Operator, resell for multiple-system operator
London Chamber Orchestra
London Contemporary Orchestra